The John Herbert House, also known as Breezeway, is a property in Franklin, Tennessee, United States, that was listed on the National Register of Historic Places in 1988.  A 1988 study of historic resources in Williamson County identified the Herbert house as one of the "best examples", along with the Beasley-Parham House, of double pen dogtrot houses in the county:  "Both houses were built with two log pens joined by an open breezeway or dogtrot and each pen has an exterior chimney. Both residences had the breezeways enclosed with weatherboard siding by the end of the 19th century. The original form and plan of the double pen dogtrot style is evident in both residences."

It was built, remodelled, or has other significance in c.1830 and c.1910. It includes double pen and Dogtrot architecture.

The property is denoted as Williamson County historic resource WM-152.

References

1830 establishments in Tennessee
Dogtrot architecture in Tennessee
Double pen architecture in Tennessee
Houses completed in 1830
Houses in Franklin, Tennessee
Houses on the National Register of Historic Places in Tennessee
National Register of Historic Places in Williamson County, Tennessee